Walter Quaife (1 April 1864 – 18 January 1943) was an English cricketer who made 224 appearances for Sussex and Warwickshire between 1884 and 1901. He scored 8,536 runs at 22.88, including ten centuries. His younger brother Willie Quaife was also a cricketer.

External links

1864 births
1943 deaths
People from Newhaven, East Sussex
Sussex cricketers
Warwickshire cricketers
English cricketers
Players cricketers
North v South cricketers
Suffolk cricketers
Players of the South cricketers
Second Class Counties cricketers